Myosin light chain kinase 4 also known as MYLK4 is an enzyme which in humans is encoded by the MYLK2 gene. MYLK4 is a member of the myosin light-chain kinase family of  serine/threonine-specific protein kinases that phosphorylate the regulatory light chain of myosin II.

This protein acts as an enzyme that catalyzes the following reaction: ATP + a protein -> ADP + a phosphoprotein.

MYLK4 is also involved in protein amino acid phosphorylation meaning that it adds a phosphate group onto the molecule.

Not very much is known about the specific functional characteristics of MLYK4, but it has recently been found that the gene may possibly have a role in having at least one driver mutation for cancer.
MYLK4 may also be involved in transferase activity, ATP binding, protein serine/threonine kinase activity, and also nucleotide binding.
Other names for MYLK4 are CaMLCK like; EG238564; MYLK4; Mylk4; Myosin light chain kinase family, member 4; SgK085; SGK085; Sgk085; Sugen kinase 85; Uncharacterized serine/threonine-protein kinase SgK085.

There are other known myosin light-chain kinase enzymes.

References 

EC 2.7.11